Cheshmeh Raj (also known as Cheshmeh Rīj, Cheshmeh Reyj, and Cheshmeh Rīch) is a village in Mud Rural District, Mud District, Sarbisheh County, South Khorasan Province, Iran. At the 2006 census, its population was 104, in 32 families.

References 

Populated places in Sarbisheh County